Geoffrey Thomas Bennett (1868–1943) was an English mathematician, professor at the University of Cambridge.

Life and work 
Born in London, he began his secondary studies at the University College School, under Robert Tucker. After one year at University College of London, Bennett obtained a scholarship at St. John's College, Cambridge, where he graduated in 1890 as Senior Wrangler. However, the best grade in the Mathematical Tripos of that year was for Philippa Fawcett, but she was not included in the list for his gender.

Upon completion of his studies he was appointed college lecturer of mathematics at Emmanuel College, Cambridge. He held a fellowship at the college from 1893 until his death in 1943. He had also great interest in music and athletics. He was a keen bicyclist and a good pianist.

During the First World War he was member of the Anti-Aircraft Experimental Section (AAES) for his versatility  and for his ability solving geometrical problems by mechanical means.

References

Bibliography

External links 
 

19th-century English mathematicians
20th-century English mathematicians
1868 births
1943 deaths
Alumni of St John's College, Cambridge